Zhukovsky District is the name of several administrative and municipal districts in Russia:
Zhukovsky District, Bryansk Oblast, an administrative and municipal district of Bryansk Oblast
Zhukovsky District, Kaluga Oblast, an administrative and municipal district of Kaluga Oblast

Historical names
Zhukovsky District, the name of Dregelsky District of Leningrad Oblast in 1927–1931.

See also
Zhukovsky (disambiguation)

References